Fountain Grove may refer to:

 Fountain Grove, California, a former utopian colony; now part of Santa Rosa, called Fountaingrove
 Fountain Grove, Missouri, an unincorporated community
 Fountaingrove Lake, California